Mohanpur is a Municipal Council in Tripura, northeast India. It is the 10th largest town in the state and a subdivision of West Tripura district.

Mohanpur subdivision has a total of 30 village panchayats, among them Anangnagar is the most populated followed by Vijaynagar, brahmakunda, debendranagar.

Demographics 
According to the 2011 census data, the total population of Mohanpur is 16,363. The number of males is 8,434 and the number of females is 7,929  Most of the population is urban with a number of 11,325, as well as, more than 5,050 people are from rural areas. Mohanpur had an average literacy rate of 80.43%, higher than the national average of 59.5%. The male literacy rate is 83.53% and female literacy rate is 77.13%.

Forest 
In the subdivision of Mohanpur there is a total of 73.869 sq km of forest land in which 73.869 sq km is Reserved forest .

Transportation 
The main transport system of the town is dependent on roadways. Mohanpur Road and Assam Agartala Road are the main roads. The town does not have any railway stations; the nearest railway station is at Jogendranagar. The distance of the town from the capital Agartala is about 23 km.

Education 

 Schools

 MOHANPUR CLASS XII SCHOOL
 MOHANPUR GIRLS' H.S. SCHOOL
 TARAPUR HIGH SCHOOL
 MOHANPUR TEA GARDEN J.B SCHOOL

 Colleges

Swami Vivekananda Mahavidyalaya

References 

Villages in West Tripura district